kernfs may refer to:
 kernfs (BSD), a pseudo file system in BSD-based operating systems
 kernfs (Linux), a set of functions in the Linux kernel that aid in creation of pseudo file systems